Jucheer was a Xiongnu of unknown relationship to the royal dynastic lineage who succeeded Doulouchu in 147 AD. In 166 AD, Jucheer joined the Xianbei and Wuhuan in raiding Han territory. When the Wuhuan and Xiongnu were confronted by Han forces they immediately surrendered. Zhang Huan wanted to have Jucheer dismissed, but Emperor Huan of Han was unwilling to remove an established ruler and deemed Jucheer to be an innocent party forced into rebellion. Jucheer died in 172 AD and was succeeded by his son Tute Ruoshi Zhujiu.

Footnotes

References

Bichurin N.Ya., "Collection of information on peoples in Central Asia in ancient times", vol. 1, Sankt Petersburg, 1851, reprint Moscow-Leningrad, 1950

Taskin B.S., "Materials on Sünnu history", Science, Moscow, 1968, p. 31 (In Russian)

Chanyus